Quintana Roo is a state of Mexico.

Quintana Roo may also refer to:

Places
 Quintana Roo Municipality, Yucatán, or the head of the municipality

People
 Andrés Quintana Roo (1787–1851), Mexican politician
 Quintana Roo Dunne, late daughter of the writers John Gregory Dunne and Joan Didion

Other
 Quintana Roo (company), a manufacturer of triathlon-specific bicycles and wetsuits
 Quintana Roo (novel), a 1984 horror novel by Gary Brandner
 Operation Quintana Roo
 Tales of the Quintana Roo, a collection of fantasy stories by American author Alice Sheldon (as James Tiptree Jr.)